Kabrai is a city and a Nagar Panchayat, And a combination of 5 villages. Moolchandra Kushwaha ji is chairman of Kabrai nagar panchayat in Mahoba district in the Indian state of Uttar Pradesh in Bundelkhand Region.
Kabrai is a City where stone mining is leading business. It is also known as stone city of uttar pradesh. There are around 350 stone crushers in and around the town. Most of city's revenue comes from mining. Due to this, place also has mining mafias. Kabrai is known for  major business firms some of the name includes, Siddh Gopal Sahu,kamlesh soni ,Dheerendra pratap singh, Jaywant Singh Ankit Tripathi, Mahesh Tiwari,Bapu g gurudev ( Gurudev Group )BIP, A.K. Tripathi, Sankar Pratap Tiwari . Kabrai is situated between Banda and Mahoba and well connected by NH 86 and NH 76 Kanpur Kabrai Road. Kabrai has a well known temple by the name of Kalshaha Baba, panch pahadi behind the name there us story that one a person was trekking on hill and there was Kalash filled with gold rolling towards him and told him to collect it and also do some good work for poor people from that day temple name is called Kalshah Baba. Kabrai is well also Connected with Railway Network. One can board trains from Kabrai Railway Station.

Geography
It has an average elevation of 157 metres (515 feet).

Demographics
Kabrai Nagar Panchayat has population of 28,564 of which 15,215 are males while 13,349 are females as per report released by Census India 2011.

Population of Children with age of 0-6 is 4535 which is 15.88 % of total population of Kabrai (NP). In Kabrai Nagar Panchayat, Female Sex Ratio is of 877 against state average of 912. Moreover Child Sex Ratio in Kabrai is around 914 compared to Uttar Pradesh state average of 902. Literacy rate of Kabrai city is 68.93 % higher than state average of 67.68 %. In Kabrai, Male literacy is around 78.44 % while female literacy rate is 58.01 %.

References

Updated by -abhi
Bundelkhand
Cities and towns in Mahoba district